Macrosamanea consanguinea is a species of flowering plant in the family Fabaceae. It is found in Brazil, Colombia, and Venezuela.

References

consanguinea
Trees of Brazil
Trees of Colombia
Trees of Venezuela
Least concern plants
Taxonomy articles created by Polbot